Nikolaos Mastoridis was a Greek boxer. He competed in the men's light heavyweight event at the 1932 Summer Olympics. At the 1932 Summer Olympics in Los Angeles, he lost to Gino Rossi of Italy in a quarterfinal.  There were only eight boxers in the light heavyweight tournament.

References

External links
 

Year of birth missing
Year of death missing
Greek male boxers
Olympic boxers of Greece
Boxers at the 1932 Summer Olympics
Place of birth missing
Light-heavyweight boxers
20th-century Greek people